The College of Vocational Studies (CVS) is a constituent college of the University of Delhi.  It is a co-educational college founded in 1972 with emphasis on vocational education to bridge the gap between traditional university education, through courses in French, German and Spanish languages, Post Graduate Diploma in Tourism and Post Graduate Diploma in Book Publishing.

The college is situated in the heart of Delhi at Sheikh Sarai-II, next to Shaheed Bhagat Singh College. The nearest metro stations are Chirag Delhi and Malviya Nagar. It is very close to PSRI hospital and Select Citywalk.

Courses offered
The college offers B.A. (Vocational Studies) in 7 fields: Management and Marketing of Insurance (MMI), Marketing Management and Retail Business (MMRB), Tourism Management, Office Management and Secretarial Practice (OMSP), Small and Medium Enterprises (SME), Human Resource Management (HRM) and Material Management (MM).

The college also offers professional honours courses like Bachelor of Management Studies (BMS) and B.A. (Hons.) Business Economics (BBE) where admission is made through Delhi University Joint Admission Test (DU-JAT). The college also has regular honours courses like B.Com. (Hons.), B.A. (Hons.) Economics, B.A. (Hons.) History, B.Sc. (Hons.) Computer Science, and B.A.(Hons.) English and B.A. (Hons.) Hindi.

Admission
The admission process for the courses BMS (Bachelor of Management Studies) and B.A.(Hons) Business Economics (BBE) is quite different from the general cutoffs based on Class 12th results, as followed for other courses. The Faculty of Management Studies (FMS), University of Delhi, undertakes this responsibility. Selection criteria for the prospective candidates consist (weightage given in brackets):

1. An objective type (MCQ) written test, the Delhi University Joint Admission Test (DU-JAT), includes a variety of questions on verbal aptitude, quantitative aptitude, logical reasoning, general awareness, and current affairs. (65%)

2. Best of fourscore in class 12th, including English and Mathematics. (35%)

The admission test (DU-JAT) is highly competitive, with only 400 seats across the university, with a selection ratio of 1:50 students.

The admission to other honours and vocational courses is made solely based on cutoffs based on Class XII best of four. The cutoff of the College of Vocational Studies is comparatively high for these courses.

References

Delhi University
 Educational institutions established in 1972
1972 establishments in Delhi